Alberto João Ferreira Louzeiro (born 22 November 1982 in Santiago do Cacém) is a Portuguese footballer who plays for União Desportiva Recreativa Sambrasense as a defensive midfielder.

Football career
In his first decade as a senior, Louzeiro played almost exclusively in the third division in his country, mainly representing Louletano D.C. and S.C. Olhanense. The sole exception to this was in the 2002–03 season, when he appeared in one game in the second level for another side in Algarve, S.C. Farense (25 minutes against S.C. Salgueiros, 0–2 away loss).

In late January 2012, aged nearly 30, Louzeiro moved abroad for the first time, signing for Aris Limassol F.C. in Cyprus. He made his First Division debut in a 0–1 home defeat to APOEL FC on the 21st, coming on as a substitute for Dušan Kerkez; after nine starts, his contract was terminated at the end of the campaign – which ended in relegation – by mutual consent.

Louzeiro joined Bulgaria's PFC Beroe Stara Zagora on 21 May 2012, on a two-year deal.

Honours
Beroe
Bulgarian Cup: 2012–13
Bulgarian Supercup: 2013

References

External links

1982 births
Living people
Portuguese footballers
Association football midfielders
Liga Portugal 2 players
Segunda Divisão players
S.C. Farense players
S.C. Olhanense players
Louletano D.C. players
G.D. Chaves players
Cypriot First Division players
Aris Limassol FC players
First Professional Football League (Bulgaria) players
PFC Beroe Stara Zagora players
Portuguese expatriate footballers
Expatriate footballers in Cyprus
Expatriate footballers in Bulgaria
Portuguese expatriate sportspeople in Cyprus
Portuguese expatriate sportspeople in Bulgaria